Gilera Nexus is a maxi-scooter manufactured by Italian company Piaggio under the Gilera brand. Sold from 2003. It is available in four engines (the 125, 250, 300 and 500 cm³).

All engines are single cylinder four-stroke water cooled.

History
Designed by Frascoli Design the Nexus 500 i.e. was first presented and marketed in 2003.

In 2006 Gilera added two other engines, the 250 and the 125 cm³. 

In 2008 the 250 cm³ model went out of production, replaced by the 300 cm³.

Version 300 and version 500 remain on sale since 2012 until 2014.

Aprilia SR Max

Since June 2011, the Nexus has been marketed in Europe and Asia also by Aprilia under the name Aprilia SR Max proposed with Piaggio Quasar 125 and 300 engines only. 

It achieved some success only in the 300 variant. Production in Italy for the European market ended definitively in 2016.

Since 2017 it has been re-proposed in China produced locally by the Zongshen Piaggio Foshan Motorcycle joint venture in the Euro 4 approved 300 variant and sold only on the local market. This model will also be imported into Europe from 2019 by the Austrian group KSR renamed Malaguti Madison 300 (KSR holds the rights to the Malaguti brand). 

From 2022 the SR Max on the Chinese market is also offered with the 250 HPE engine.

Engines and specifications

References

External links 
Official Gilera website

Gilera motorcycles
Motor scooters